Mimas tiliae, the lime hawk-moth, is a moth of the family Sphingidae. It is found throughout the Palearctic region and the Near East, and has also been identified in Canada's east and western provinces and in northern Spain (Europe). The species was first described by Carl Linnaeus in his 1758 10th edition of Systema Naturae.

This species is quite variable, though not confusable with any other sphingid of the Palearctic in its markings, the ground colour of the forewings being pinkish or buff, darker towards the tornus, marked with one or two dark green or brown blotches which are sometimes merged to form a continuous band across the middle of the forewing. The hindwings are plainer, grey or buffish brown. It exhibits sexual dimorphism, the male usually being smaller but more strongly marked than the female. Usually, the forewing ground colour is brownish in females and decidedly green in males, but there are many exceptions. The female abdomen is straight and fat with fully formed eggs, which are already present when the female emerges (as in all species of Smerinthini). The male abdomen, on the other hand, is strongly curved and slender.

Forms include
f. brunnea Bartel ground colour brown
f. pallida Tutt ground colour grey
f. lutescens Tutt yellow
f. virescens Tutt ground colour green
f. transversa Tutt dark median band of the forewing entire
f. tiliae dark median band narrowly separated
f. obsoleta Clark dark median band completely absent

This moth flies at night in May and June, and is attracted to light. The adults do not feed.

The larva is green with yellow and red markings along the side and a blue horn at the hind end, typical of the family. It feeds mainly on lime but has also been recorded feeding on other trees and shrubs (see list below). The colour changes to purple-grey when ready to pupate, at which point the larvae wander in search of a pupation site. The species overwinters as a pupa in the soil at the base of its host tree.

Recorded food plants 
Alnus - alder
Betula - birch
Morus - mulberry
Prunus
Quercus - oak
Tilia - lime
Ulmus - elm

Notes

References 

Chinery, Michael Collins Guide to the Insects of Britain and Western Europe 1986 (Reprinted 1991)
Skinner, Bernard Colour Identification Guide to Moths of the British Isles 1984

External links

Lime Hawk-moth UKMoths
Description in Richard South The Moths of the British Isles
Lepiforum e.V.

Smerinthini
Moths described in 1758
Moths of Europe
Taxa named by Carl Linnaeus
Moths of Asia
Moths of North America